Kelvingi is a village in Viimsi Parish, Harju County in northern Estonia. As of 2011 census, the settlement's population was 518.

Kelvingi village was established in 1993 on the territory of a former Soviet military shooting range.

There is a small harbour, kindergarten and a society house located in Kelvingi.

References

External links
Kelvingi kindergarten 

Villages in Harju County
Viimsi Parish